Nayda Venegas Brown (born July 24, 1958) is a Puerto Rican politician affiliated with the New Progressive Party (PNP). She was a member of the Puerto Rico Senate, from 2017 to 2021, representing Carolina Senatorial district.

Early years and studies
Nayda Venegas Brown was born on July 24, 1958, the daughter of boxer Juan Evangelista Venegas who was the first Olympic medalist from Puerto Rico, and his wife Hilda Brown Quiñones.

She studied administration and secretarial science at Instituto de Banca y Comercio, Criminal Justice at Universidad del Este, of the Ana G. Méndez University System, and theology at the Mizpa Pentecostal University in San Juan, Puerto Rico.

Political career
Nayda Venegas Brown was the President of the Municipal legislature of Loiza until December 31, 2016. In the 2016 election, she was elected as one of the Senator for the Carolina District.

In 2018, she introduced Project 950, a bill that regulates abortion.

References

Members of the Senate of Puerto Rico
People from Loíza, Puerto Rico
Republican Party (Puerto Rico) politicians
Puerto Rican women in politics
Living people
1958 births